is a Japanese actress.

Filmography

Film
 Kaze no Dadu (2006), Ayumi Asano
 Adan (2006), Adan
 Paradise Kiss (2011)
 Run60 (2011), Maki
 Sukiyaki (2011), Shiori Mizushima
 Ramo Trip (2012), Mari Ijichi
 Chips (2012), Wakaba Ōnishi
 Love for Beginners (2012), Nana
 Bokutachi no Kōkan Nikki (2013), Maiko Utagawa
 I Hate Tokyo (2013)
 It All Began When I Met You (2013), Yukina Yamaguchi
 The Little House (2014), Yuki
 Nishino Yukihiko no Koi to Bōken (2014), Tama
 Taiyō no Suwaru Basho (2014), Kyōko Suzuhara
 Have a Song on Your Lips (2015), Haruko Matsuyama
 Initiation Love (2015), Miyako Ishimaru
 Piece of Cake (2015), Nanako
 The Cross (2016), Sayuri Nakagawa
 Reminiscence (2017), Mari Tadokoro
 Hibana: Spark (2017), Maki
 The Scythian Lamb (2018), Aya Ishida
 The Many Faces of Ito (2018), Rio Yazaki (E)
 My Retirement, My Life (2018), Yumiko Sano
 Modest Heroes (2018), Kanini (voice)
 The Fable (2019), Yōko
 Iwane: Sword of Serenity (2019)
 The Fable: The Killer Who Doesn't Kill (2021), Yōko
 Blue (2021), Chika Amano
 99.9 Criminal Lawyer: The Movie (2021), Maiko Ozaki
 Love Life (2022), Taeko
 7 Secretaries: The Movie (2022), Chiyo Mochizuki
 Rohan au Louvre (2023), Nanase

Television
 Dandan (NHK, 2008–2009), Suzuno
 Hanawake no Yonshimai (TBS, 2011)
 Honto ni Atta Kowai Hanashi Natsu no Tokubetsu-hen 2011 (Fuji TV, 2011), Harumi Kashiwada
 Mitsu no Aji: A Taste of Honey (Fuji TV, 2011), Rai Yōka
 Incident Akujotachi no Mesu (Fuji TV, 2011)
 Keishichō Shissōka Takashiro Kengo (TV Asahi, 2011), Michi Miura
 Run 60 (2012, MBS), Maki
 Ataru (TBS, 2012), Riko Suzuhara
 Umechan Sensei (NHK, 2012), Shizuko Nojima
 Hōkago wa Mystery to Tomo ni (TBS, 2012), Eiko Noda
 Naniwa Shōnen Tanteidan (TBS, 2012), Mika Haruna
 Kuro no Onna Kyōshi (TBS, 2012), Haruka Aoyagi
 Dorokutā: Aruhi, Boku wa Mura de Tatta Hitori no Isha ni Natta (NHK BS, 2012)
 Osozaki no Himawari: Boku no Jinsei, Renewal (Fuji TV, 2012), Haruna Imai
 Sodom no Ringo: Lot o Koroshita Musumetachi (Wowow, 2013)
 Kumo no Kaidan (NTV, 2013), Akiko Tasaka
 Furueru Ushi (Wowow, 2013), Kozue Tagawa
 Kyō no Hi wa Sayōnara (NTV, 2013), Etsuko Tanabe
 Henshin Interviewer no Yūutsu (TBS, 2013), Rika Kahiyama
 Tokeiya no Musume (TBS, 2013), Chikako Kuniki
 Hasegawa Machiko Monogatari: Sazaesan ga Umareta Hi (Fuji TV, 2013), Yōko Hasegawa
 Ashita, Mama ga Inai (NTV, 2014), Kanai Mizusawa
 Kuroi Fukuin: Kokusaisen Stewardess Satsujin Jiken (TV Asahi, 2014), Setsuko Ikuta
 Yonimo Kimyōna Monogatari '14 Haru no Tokubetsu-hen (Fuji TV, 2014), Miyū Itsuki
 Suteki na Sen Taxi (KTV, 2014), Marina Kōzai
 Zeni no Sensō (KTV, 2015), Kozue Aoike
 Mother Game: Kanojotachi no Kaikyū (TBS, 2015), Kiko Kamahara
 Stone's Cocoon (Wowow, 2015), Tōko Kisaragi
 Moribito: Guardian of the Spirit (NHK, 2016), The Second Empress
 A Life: A Love (TBS, 2017), Yuki Shibata
 I'm Your Destiny(NTV, 2017), Haruko Kogetsu
 99.9 Criminal Lawyer Season II (TBS, 2017), Maiko Ozaki
 The Many Faces of Ito (TBS, 2017), Rio Yazaki (E)
 Ōoku the Final (Fuji TV, 2019), Kume
 7 Secretaries (TV Asahi, 2020), Chiyo Mochizuki
 Awaiting Kirin (NHK, 2020–21), Hiroko
 #bemyfamily (TBS, 2021), Momota Rei

Japanese dub
 Seasons (2016), narration

Bibliography

Photobooks
 Fumino (Wani Books, 9 November 2013)

Awards and Prizes

References

External links
 

1987 births
Living people
People from Tokyo
Japanese actresses